The 73rd Scripps National Spelling Bee was held in Washington, D.C. at the Grand Hyatt Washington on May 31 – June 1, 2000, sponsored by the E.W. Scripps Company.

Twelve-year-old George Abraham Thampy, from Saint Louis, Missouri won the competition by correctly spelling the word "demarche". Thampy had taken third place in the prior year's bee, and fourth place in the 1998 bee. He also took second place in the National Geography Bee a week before winning the Spelling Bee. Thampy was the second home-schooled student to ever win the Bee. The first was Rebecca Sealfon at the 1997 bee.

Second place went to 12-year old Sean Conley of Newark, California who missed "apotropaic". He went on to win the next year's Bee. Third place went to 14-year old Allison Miller of Niskayuna, New York, who missed "venire".

There were 248 spellers this year. 138 spellers were eliminated in the first day of competition. The first place prize was $10,000, followed by $5000 for second, and $3000 for third place.

References

Scripps National Spelling Bee competitions
2000 in Washington, D.C.
2000 in education
May 2000 events in the United States
June 2000 events in the United States